The 2021 Intercontinental GT Challenge was the sixth season of the Intercontinental GT Challenge. Normally a five round season, the races in the Pacific Rim were eliminated because of pandemic-related restrictions, reducing the season to three rounds, one in Europe (Total 24 Hours of Spa on 31 July), one in North America (Indianapolis 8 Hour), and one in Africa (Kyalami 9 Hours, later postponed to 5 February 2022). Nicky Catsburg and Augusto Farfus were the defending drivers' champions and Porsche was the defending Manufacturers' champion.

Calendar
At the annual press conference during the 2020 24 Hours of Spa on 23 October, the Stéphane Ratel Organisation announced the first draft of the 2021 calendar.

Kyalami 9 Hours was rescheduled from 2–4 December 2021 to 3–5 February 2022 due to SARS-CoV-2 Omicron variant cases in South Africa.

Entry list

Notes

Race results

Championship standings
Scoring System
Championship points were awarded for the first ten positions in each race. Entries were required to complete 75% of the winning car's race distance in order to be classified and earn points. Individual drivers were required to participate for a minimum of 25 minutes in order to earn championship points in any race. A manufacturer only received points for its two highest placed cars in each round.

Driver's championship
The results indicate the classification relative to other drivers in the series, not the classification in the race.

See also
2021 GT World Challenge Europe
2021 GT World Challenge Europe Sprint Cup
2021 GT World Challenge Europe Endurance Cup
2021 GT World Challenge America
2021 GT World Challenge Asia
2021 GT World Challenge Australia

References

External links

2021 in motorsport
2022 in motorsport